The 2012 Maria Sharapova tennis season officially began on 16 January 2012 with the start of the 2012 Australian Open. Sharapova began the season ranked the number 4 player in the world.

All matches

See also

 2012 Serena Williams tennis season
 2012 WTA Tour
 Maria Sharapova career statistics

External links

Sharapova tennis season
Maria Sharapova tennis seasons
2012 in Russian women's sport
2012 in Russian tennis